DeCicco is a surname. Notable people with the surname include:

Dom DeCicco (born 1988), American football player
Frank DeCicco (1935–1986), American mobster
George DeCicco (born 1929), American mobster
Mike DeCicco (1927–2013), American fencing coach

See also
Anne Marie DeCicco-Best (born 1964), Canadian mayor
De Cicco v. Schweizer, a United States contract law case
DeCicco's, a family-owned chain of supermarkets in the northern suburbs of New York City

Italian-language surnames